Megachile rhodosiaca is a species of bee in the family Megachilidae. It was described by Rebmann in 1972.

References

Rhodosiaca
Insects described in 1972